2003 World Championships may refer to:

 Alpine skiing: Alpine World Ski Championships 2003
 Aquatics: 2003 World Aquatics Championships
 Athletics: 2003 World Championships in Athletics
Cross-country running: 2003 IAAF World Cross Country Championships
Road running: 2003 IAAF World Half Marathon Championships
 Badminton: 2003 IBF World Championships
 Bandy: 2003 Bandy World Championship
 Biathlon: Biathlon World Championships 2003
 Boxing: 2003 World Amateur Boxing Championships
 Curling:
 2003 World Men's Curling Championship
 2003 World Women's Curling Championship
 Darts: 2003 BDO World Darts Championship
 Darts: 2003 PDC World Darts Championship
 Figure skating: 2003 World Figure Skating Championships
 2003 World Artistic Gymnastics Championships
 Ice hockey: 2003 Men's World Ice Hockey Championships
 Ice hockey: 2003 Women's World Ice Hockey Championships
 Netball: 2003 Netball World Championships
 Nordic skiing: FIS Nordic World Ski Championships 2003
 Speed skating:
Allround: 2003 World Allround Speed Skating Championships
 Sprint: 2003 World Sprint Speed Skating Championships
Single distances: 2003 World Single Distance Speed Skating Championships

See also
 2003 World Cup (disambiguation)
 2003 Continental Championships (disambiguation)
 2003 World Junior Championships (disambiguation)